Dembo is a surname, and may refer to:

 António Dembo, Angolan leader of UNITA
 Fennis Dembo, American basketball player
 Isaac Dembo, Russian-Jewish physician
 Leonard Dembo, Zimbabwean guitar-band musician
 Richard Dembo, French director and screenwriter of Israeli origin
 Ron Dembo, financial engineer and entrepreneur
 Yelena Dembo, Greek chess player

A town:

 Dembo, Democratic Republic of the Congo
 Dembo, Cameroon